Jeff Barker is the name of:

 Jeff Barker (footballer) (1915–1985), English football player
 Jeff Barker (playwright) (born 1954), American playwright, director, professor, and actor
 Jeff Barker (politician) (born 1943), Democratic member of the Oregon House of Representatives

See also
 Geoff Barker (born 1949), English footballer
 Barker (surname)